Lai Kin Ian  is the Director of Public Prosecution under the Procurator General of Macau. He is a senior state attorney under the Secretariat for Administration and Justice (Macau).

See also
 Politics of Macau

References

Living people
Government ministers of Macau
Year of birth missing (living people)